Karl Svozil (born 18 December 1956 in Vienna, Austria) is an Austrian physicist educated at the  University of Vienna and Heidelberg University. Visiting scholar  at the Lawrence Berkeley Laboratory of the University of California at Berkeley, U.S.A. (1982–1983),
the Lebedev Institute of the Moscow State University, and the Ioffe Institute, St. Petersburg (1986). Docent in Theoretical Physics at the Vienna Technical University.
Ao. Univ. Professor at the Institute for Theoretical Physics of the Vienna Technical University. External Researcher at the Centre for Discrete
Mathematics and Theoretical Computer Science of the University of Auckland.

Research in quantum theory, applications of computability theory, algorithmic information theory, constructive mathematics (in Errett Bishop's sense) in theoretical physics, equilibrium dynamics.

Notes

Selected bibliography
K. Svozil. Quantum Logic, Springer, Singapore, 1998, xviii+214 pages.
K. Svozil. Randomness and Undecidability in Physics,  World Scientific, Singapore, 1993, xvi+292 pages.

External links
 
 

20th-century Austrian physicists
21st-century Austrian physicists
1956 births
Living people
Academic staff of TU Wien